Pressure experiments are experiments performed at pressures lower or higher than atmospheric pressure, called low-pressure experiments and high-pressure experiments, respectively. Pressure experiment are necessary because substances behave differently at different pressures. For example, water boils at a lower temperature at lower pressures. The equipment used for pressure experiments depends on whether the pressure is to be increased or decreased and by how much. A vacuum pump is used to remove the air out of a vacuum vessel for low-pressure experiments. The piston is shifted with hydraulics, decreasing the volume inside the confining cylinder and increasing the pressure. The diamond anvil cell is used to create extremely high pressures, as much as a million atmospheres, though only over a small area.

References

See also 
 Orders of magnitude (pressure)

Physics experiments